Fitzalan Pursuivant of Arms Extraordinary is a current officer of arms in England.  As a pursuivant extraordinary, Fitzalan is a royal officer of arms, but is not a member of the corporation of the College of Arms in London.  As with many other extraordinary offices of arms, Fitzalan Pursuivant obtains its title from one of the baronies held by the Duke of Norfolk, Earl Marshal of England; the appointment was first made for the coronation of Queen Victoria in 1837. The badge of office was assigned in 1958 and is derived from a Fitzalan badge of the fifteenth century.  It can be blazoned An Oak Sprig Vert Acorns Or, but is also recorded as A Sprig of Oak proper.

The first four Fitzalans, beginning with Sir Albert Woods,   subsequently became Garter Principal King of Arms. Charles Wilfrid Scott-Giles, the well-known heraldic writer, also served as Fitzalan Pursuivant. The current Fitzalan Pursuivant of Arms Extraordinary is Alastair Andrew Bernard Reibey Bruce of Crionaich, second cousin to the Hon. Adam Bruce, Marchmont Herald of Arms, currently also serving as the Governor of Edinburgh Castle.

Holders of the office

See also
 Heraldry
 Officer of Arms

References
Citations

Bibliography
 The College of Arms, Queen Victoria Street : being the sixteenth and final monograph of the London Survey Committee, Walter H. Godfrey, assisted by Sir Anthony Wagner, with a complete list of the officers of arms, prepared by H. Stanford London, (London, 1963)
 A History of the College of Arms &c, Mark Noble, (London, 1804)

External links
The College of Arms
CUHGS Officer of Arms Index

English offices of arms